This is list of members of the Argentine Senate from 10 December 2015 to 9 December 2017.

Composition 
As of 9 December 2017

Election cycles

List of senators

The table is sorted by provinces in alphabetical order, and then with their deputies in alphabetical order by their surnames. All deputies start their term on 10 December, and end it on 9 December of the corresponding years, except when noted.

See also
List of current Argentine deputies
List of former Argentine Senators

Notes

External links
Official site 

2015
2015 in Argentina
2016 in Argentina
2017 in Argentina